K. L. Saigal (11 April 1904 – 18 January 1947) was an Indian singer-actor who acted and sang in Hindi and Bengali films and was active from 1932 to 1947. He is cited as the first "superstar" of Indian Cinema with films like President, Devdas and Street Singer leaving an impact on Hindi film music. He sang a total of 185 songs which included film, non-film, ghazals, Hindi/Urdu, Bengali, Punjabi, Tamil and Persian songs. However, only 170 songs still survive.  Saigal was introduced to B. N. Sircar by R. C. Boral and Pankaj Mullick, who had met him at an impromptu evening singing session. Sircar cast Saigal in his debut role as the main lead in Mohabbat Ke Ansu (1932). The same year he acted in Zinda Lash (1932), and Subah Ka Sitara (1932), both films were produced by Sircar's New Theatres Ltd. Calcutta and directed by Premankur Atorthy.

Saigal's earliest recorded song is "Jhulana Jhulao Ri" in Dev Ghandharva Raga for Hindustan Records. In Yahudi Ki Ladki (1933) Saigal's singing of Ghalib's ghazal "Nuktacheen Hai Ghame Dil" composed by Pankaj Mullick in Raga Bhimpalasi, is considered a classic rendition. Chandidas (1934) was New Theatres first big success with the song "Prem Nagar Mein Banaoongi Ghar Main" becoming popular.

In 1935, Saigal acted in the Hindi version of P. C. Barua's Devdas (1935) in the title role. The film, with its songs "Baalam Aaye Baso Morey Man Mein" and "Dukh Ke Ab Din Beetat Nahin" sung by Saigal, is cited as a "milestone" in Indian cinema, and made Saigal, New Theatres first superstar.
 The song "Piye Ja Aur Piye Ja" from Pujarin (1936) was recorded without any rehearsal. Composed in Raga Khamaj with a mix of waltz and western orchestra, the song "enchanted listeners". "President" (1937), cited as Saigal's finest film had one of his "memorable" songs "Ik Bangla Bane Nyara". Songs like "Babul Mora Naihar Chhooto Hi Jaaye" from Street Singer (1938), "Karun Kya Aas Niras Bhai"  from Dushman (1939), "Soja Rajkumari Soja from Zindagi (1940), "Diya Jalao" from Tansen (1943), "Gham Diye Mustakil" from ShahJahan (1946), and bhajans like "Madhukar Shyam hamare chor", "Sar Par Kadamb Ki Chhaiyan" (Raag Bhairavi), "Maiya Mori Main Nahi Maakhan Khayo" from Bhakta Surdas (1942), cited as "unforgettable bhajans" affirmed him as "an immortal singer".

Hindi Film Songs

He is one of the best-known and most respected playback singers in India.

Bengali Songs

Non-film Songs

Notes
Raghava R. Menon "The Pilgrim of the Swara" Clarion Books (1978)
 
 
 All of the currently available 172 songs of K. L. Saigal, from films and others are here "All Saigal Songs by S. Madani"

References

External links

Khurshid Anwar Parwana 1947 Copyright Khwaja Khurshid Anwar Trust and Irfan Anwar. Hindi Film Songs Surjit Singh.
Naushad views on K. L. Saigal
 K. L. Saigal by Suresh Chandvankar
 Jab Dil Hi Toot Gaya 'Hamraaz' and Raghuwanshi

Saigal